Shame-Based Man, released on April 11, 1995, was the first album by the comedian Bruce McCulloch. Produced and arranged by Bob Wiseman  It has 20 tracks of McCulloch's comedic music.

Track listing
"Grade 8" (Bruce McCulloch, Bob Wiseman, Brian Connelly) – 2:59
"Stalking" (McCulloch, Wiseman) – 2:11
"Al Miller" (McCulloch, Connelly) – 2:30
"Heroin Pig" (McCulloch) – 0:41
"40 Housewives" (McCulloch, Connelly) – 2:38
"Doors" (McCulloch, Kevin McDonald, Wiseman) – 3:44
"Acid Radio" (McCulloch) – 1:03
"Lift Me Up" (McCulloch, Wiseman) – 3:35
"Our Love" (McCulloch, Wiseman) – 2:34
"Not Happy" (McCulloch, Connelly) – 4:17
"Answering Machine" (McCulloch, Connelly) – 3:10
"Daddy's on the Drink" (McCulloch, Wiseman) – 3:10
"He Said, She Said" (McCulloch, Wiseman) – 1:28
"Daves I Know" (McCulloch) – 2:21
"That's America" (McCulloch, Connelly) – 2:33
"Baby Jesus (Radio)" (McCulloch) – 1:02
"Eraserhead" (McCulloch, Wiseman, Hugh Phillips, Don Kerr, Connelly) – 3:11
"Vigil" (McCulloch, Wiseman) – 4:08
"When You're Fat" (McCulloch, Wiseman) – 2:16
"Lonely People" (McCulloch) – 1:11

Personnel
Bruce McCulloch     -     Vocals, mixer
Bob Wiseman     -    Producer, Arranger, Keyboards, Accordion, Additional Vocals & mixing
L. Stu Young    -     Engineer, mixer
Brian Connelly     -     Guitar, mixer
Hugh Phillips     -     Bass, additional vocals
Don Kerr     -     Drums, additional vocals
George Koller     -     Cello
Colin Couch     -     Tuba
Sarah MaCelcheran     -     Trumpet
Steve Donald     -     Trombone
Don Rooke     -     Lap Steel
Shannon McGaw     -     Additional Vocals
Tamara Gorski     -     Additional Vocals
Don Frank     -     Additional Vocals

Notes

1995 albums
Bruce McCulloch albums
Atlantic Records albums
1990s comedy albums